"Haven't You Heard" is a song recorded by Canadian country music artist Shirley Myers. It was released in 1997 as the second single from her debut album, Let It Rain. It peaked at number 9 on the RPM Country Tracks chart in February 1998.

Chart performance

References

1997 songs
1997 singles
Shirley Myers songs
Songs written by Shirley Myers
Stony Plain Records singles